Olga Golovanova (born 13 September 1983) is a Russian snowboarder. She competed in the women's parallel giant slalom event at the 2006 Winter Olympics.

References

External links
 

1983 births
Living people
Russian female snowboarders
Olympic snowboarders of Russia
Snowboarders at the 2006 Winter Olympics
People from Tashtagol
Sportspeople from Kemerovo Oblast